Adriano Olivetti (11 April 1901 – 27 February 1960) was an Italian engineer, politician, and industrialist whose entrepreneurial activity thrived on the idea that profit should be reinvested for the benefits of the whole society. He was son of the founder of Olivetti, Camillo Olivetti, and Luisa Revel, the daughter of a prominent Waldensian pastor and scholar. He was known worldwide during his lifetime as the Italian manufacturer of Olivetti typewriters, calculators, and computers. The Olivetti empire had been begun by his father. Initially, the factory, consisting of 30 workers, concentrated on electric measurement devices. By 1908, 25 years after Remington in the United States, Olivetti started to produce typewriters.

Olivetti was an entrepreneur and innovator who transformed shop-like operations into a modern factory. In and out of the factory, he both practiced and preached the utopian system of the Community Movement; he never managed to build a mass following. In his company, apart from managers and technicians, he enrolled a large number of artists like writers and architects, following his deep interest in design and urban and building planning that were closely linked with his personal utopian vision. His participatory and enlightened corporate model was contrasted to the paternalism of Fiat S.p.A.'s Vittorio Valletta.

Biography 

Olivetti's father, Camillo Olivetti, who was Jewish, believed that his children could get a better education at home. Olivetti's formative years were spent under the tutelage of his mother, daughter of the local Waldensian pastor, an educated and sober woman. As a socialist, his father emphasized the non-differentiation between manual and intellectual work. During their time away from study, his children worked with and under the same conditions as his workers. The discipline and sobriety the older Olivetti imposed on his family induced rebellion in the younger Olivetti's adolescence manifested by a dislike of his father's workplace and by his studying at a polytechnic school of subjects other than the mechanical engineering that his father wanted.

After graduation in chemical engineering at the Polytechnic University of Turin in 1924, Olivetti joined the company for a short while. When he became undesirable to Benito Mussolini's Italian fascist regime, his father sent him to the United States to learn the roots of American industrial power. For the same reasons, he later went to England. Upon his return, he married Paola Levi, a daughter of Giuseppe Levi and a sister of his good friend Natalia Ginzburg, a marriage that produced three children but did not last long.

His visit to various plants in the United States, especially Remington, convinced Olivetti that productivity is a function of the organizational system. With the approval of father, he organized the production system at Olivetti on a quasi-Taylorian model and transformed the shop into a factory with departments and divisions. Possibly as a result of this reorganization, output per man-hour doubled within five years. Olivetti for the first time sold half of the typewriters used in Italy in 1933. He shared with his workers the productivity gains by increasing salaries, fringe benefits, and services.

In 1931, he visited the Soviet Union and created an Advertising Department at Olivetti that worked with artists and designers. The creation of an Organization Office followed one year later, when he became general manager, and the project for the first portable typewriter started. His success in business did not diminish his idealism. In the 1930s, he developed an interest in architecture, as well as urban and community planning. He supervised a housing plan for the workers at Ivrea, a small city near Turin, where the Olivetti plant is still located, and a zoning proposal for the adjacent Aosta Valley. In Fascist Italy, patronizing workers at work and at home was in line with the corporative design of the regime. While Olivetti showed distaste for the regime, he joined the National Fascist Party and became a Catholic. During World War II, he participated in the underground anti-fascist and Italian resistance movements, was jailed, and at the end sought refuge in Switzerland. There, he was in close contact with the intellectual emigrees and he was able to further develop his socio-philosophy of the Community Movement. He also had contacts with representatives of Britain's Special Operations Executive. With these, he tried to avoid the Allied invasion of Italy and to obtain a negotiated Italian retreat from the war assuming a mediation of the Holy See and making strong the support that he enjoyed with influential Italian political circles.

During the immediate post-war years, the Olivetti empire expanded rapidly, only to be briefly on the verge of bankruptcy after the acquisition of Underwood Typewriter Company in the late 1950s. During this period, first calculators and then computers replaced the typewriter as a prime production focus. Olivetti shared his time between business pursuits and attempts to practice and spread the utopian ideal of community life. His belief was that people who respect each other and their environment can avoid war and poverty. His utopian idea was similar to that preached by socialists, such as Charles Fourier and Robert Owen, during the previous century.

Death 
On the 27 February 1960, Olivetti took a train from Arona, Piedmont, in the north of Italy, towards Lausanne, Switzerland. A few kilometres after the border between the two countries, he had a neuronal bleeding that led to his death. An autopsy has not been delivered, leaving various hypothesis opened, including the one that sees the participation of some United States-based lobbies in Olivetti’s death. After the declassification of documents elaborated by the Central Intelligence Agency (CIA), it was discovered that Olivetti had been object of investigations by the CIA for several years.

In his enterprises, Olivetti's attempts at utopia may be translated in practice as actions of an enlightened boss or a form of corporatism. He decreased the hours of work and increased salaries and fringe benefits. By 1957, Olivetti workers were the best paid of all in the metallurgical industry, and Olivetti workers showed the highest productivity. His corporatism also succeeded in having his workers accept a company union not tied to the powerful national metallurgical trade unions.

During the 1950s, the Community Movement succeeded politically in Ivrea, where Olivetti was elected mayor in 1956. The utopia at the factory and in Italy at large began withering away even before his death in 1960. Olivetti's era saw great changes in Italian business and in industrial relations. New organizational methods were sought and humanistic idealism spread during the cruel time of World War II, as well as during the difficult post-war years. While the utopia of Olivetti could not have easily survived, it helped induce the rapid reconversion of Italy's industry from war to peacetime production.

Further reading

References

External links

Adriano Olivetti Foundation
Adriano Olivetti biography
Adriano Olivetti short biography on "History Computer" by IEEE
 – a film by Emanuele Piccardo on Olivetti

1901 births
1960 deaths
People from Ivrea
Italian Waldensians
20th-century Italian businesspeople
Olivetti people
Italian chemical engineers
L'Espresso founders
Italian magazine founders
Deputies of Legislature III of Italy
Polytechnic University of Turin alumni
Compasso d'Oro Award recipients